Judicial dissolution, sometimes called the corporate death penalty, is a legal procedure in which a corporation is forced to dissolve or cease to exist.

Dissolution is the revocation of a corporation's charter for significant harm to society. In some countries, there are corporate manslaughter laws; however, almost all countries enable the revocation of a corporate charter. There have been numerous calls in the literature for a "corporate death penalty". Most recently a study argued that industries that kill more people each year than they employ should have an industry-wide corporate death penalty. Some legal analysis has been done on the idea to revoke corporate charters for environmental violations such as for severe environmental pollution. Actual judicial dissolutions in the United States are rare. For example, Markoff has shown that no publicly traded company failed because of a criminal conviction that occurred between 2001 and 2010.

Companies suggested as deserving the corporate death penalty include Eli Lilly & Company, Equifax, Unocal Corporation, and Wells Fargo. "If Volkswagen or other examples in this volume were forced out of existence, this would send a message", John Hulpke wrote in the Journal of Management Inquiry in 2017.

One argument against its use is that otherwise innocent employees and shareholders will lose money or their jobs. But author David Dayen argues in The New Republic that "the risk of a corporate death penalty should inspire active governance practices to protect their investments".

Historical examples

In 1890, New York's highest court revoked the charter of the North River Sugar Refining Corporation on the grounds that it was abusing its powers as a monopoly.

In 2022, New York Supreme Court Judge Joel M. Cohen rejected a move by the state's Attorney General to dissolve the National Rifle Association of America. According to The Wall Street Journal, "the state's allegations of corruption and mismanagement by NRA top officials fell short of the public harm required to impose the 'corporate death penalty' on the nonprofit group".

See also
 Corporate crime
 Capital punishment

References

Anti-corporate activism
Criminology
 
Problems in business economics
United States corporate law